The 1903 Notre Dame football team was an American football team that represented the University of Notre Dame in the 1903 college football season. In its second season with James Farragher as coach, the team compiled an  record, shut out every opponent, and outscored all opponents by a combined total of 291 to 0.

Schedule

References

Notre Dame
Notre Dame Fighting Irish football seasons
College football undefeated seasons
Notre Dame football